K186 or K-186 may refer to:

K-186 (Kansas highway), a state highway in Kansas
HMS Anchusa (K186), a former UK Royal Navy ship 
Russian submarine Omsk (K-186), a Russian submarine

See also
Kepler-186f
Kepler-186